SIV (formerly known as Sheffield International Venues) is a facilities management company based in Sheffield, England that operates a number of sporting and entertainment facilities in that city. It is a fully owned subsidiary of the not-for-profit Sheffield City Trust, and serves as its operational arm. 

The facilities it operates include:

English Institute of Sport Sheffield
Hillsborough Leisure Centre
iceSheffield
Sheffield Arena
Ponds Forge International Sports Centre
Sheffield City Hall
The Spa, Scarborough
 Whitby Pavilion
 Tapton Park Golf Course
 Westfield Sports Centre
 Beauchief Golf Course
 Birley Wood Golf Course
 Concord Sports Centre
 Heeley Swimming Baths
 Springs Leisure Centre
 Tinsley Golf Course

References

External links
SIV official website
SIV Events & Experiences website
Fitness Unlimited

Sport in Sheffield